The events that occurred in the year 1780 in Russia

Incumbents
 Monarch – Catherine II

Events

 
 Kharkov Governorate
 Ministry of Finance (Russia)

Births

Deaths

References

1780 in Russia
Years of the 18th century in the Russian Empire